These are the international rankings of Algeria

International rankings

References

Algeria